The Migratory Birds Convention Act (also MBCA) is a Canadian law established in 1917 and significantly updated in June 1994 which contains regulations to protect migratory birds, their eggs, and their nests from destruction by wood harvesting, hunting, trafficking and commercialization. A permit is required to engage in any of these activities.

History

In 1909 the federal government established the Advisory Board on Wildlife Protection, which notably included C.G. Hewitt and James Harkin as prominent members. This board would go on to sign the Migratory Bird Convention with the United States because of concern both countries had regarding the uncontrolled hunting of waterfowl and shorebirds. The original MBCA law was passed to satisfy the terms of this agreement with the United States. The updated version includes stronger enforcement and greater penalties. A geographical area may be designated as a Migratory Bird Refuge under this convention; this restricts activities targeting a specified set of birds in that area, but does not protect the land or water features. To establish complete habitat protection, the more stringent requirements of the Canada Wildlife Act are necessary.

See also
 List of Migratory Bird Sanctuaries of Canada
 Migratory Bird Treaty Act of 1918, the American law implementing the treaty

References

External links
 Migratory Birds Convention Act, 1994

Environmental law in Canada
1917 in the environment
1917 in Canadian law
1994 in Canadian law
Bird migration